Giorgio Cornaro may refer to:

Giorgio Cornaro (1374–1439), the grandson of Marco Cornaro, doge of Venice, the grandfather of Catherine Cornaro, queen of Chypre
Giorgio Cornaro (1452–1527), the former's grandson, the great-great-grandson of Marco Cornaro, doge of Venice and the brother of Catherine Cornaro, queen of Chypre
Giorgio Cornaro (1517–1570), grandson of the former, portrayed by Titian in 1538
Giorgio Cornaro (bishop of Padua) (1613–1663), Italian Roman Catholic bishop
Giorgio Cornaro (bishop of Treviso) (1524–1578), Italian Roman Catholic bishop
Giorgio Cornaro (cardinal) (1658–1722), Italian cardinal
Portrait of a Man with a Falcon, c. 1537 portrait by Titian